Dadeland Station is a lifestyle shopping center located in Dadeland, Florida in the metropolitan Miami suburb of Glenvar Heights, near the border with Kendall.  It is located immediately across the Snapper Creek and within walking distance of the popular Dadeland Mall.

Dadeland Station is directly served by the Miami Metrorail at Dadeland North station.

Stores
 Michaels
 Dick's Sporting Goods (formerly Sports Authority)
 Best Buy
 Target
 Bed Bath & Beyond
 PetSmart
 Lan-Pan Asian Cafe
 Starbucks (Inside Target)
 Pizza Hut Express (Inside Target) 
 Hair Cuttery
 Nails by VN
 Avis & Budget Car Rental
 Enterprise Car Rental
 Zaniac Tutoring Services

The Towers of Dadeland

Located directly across from Dadeland Station on 84th street in front of Michaels is Towers of Dadeland apartment building. On the ground level you will find the following businesses 

 Moto Pizza Cafe and Grill
 Hair Color Salon

References

Shopping malls in Miami-Dade County, Florida
Shopping malls established in 1996